12 Şubat Stadium is a multi-purpose stadium in Kahramanmaraş, Turkey.  It is currently used mostly for football matches and is the home ground of TFF Second League team Kahramanmaraşspor.

The stadium was built in 1970 and currently holds 15,000 people.

References

External links

Football venues in Turkey
Multi-purpose stadiums in Turkey
Sports venues completed in 1970